The third season of the High School DxD anime television series, was directed by Tetsuya Yanagisawa and produced by TNK. Its first nine episodes adapts material from the fifth to the seventh volumes of the light novels by Ichiei Ishibumi and Miyama-Zero, while the last three episodes form an original self-contained story arc. 

The season originally ran from April 4, to June 20, 2015 on TV Tokyo's satellite channel AT-X in Japan. In North America, the anime series is licensed by Funimation for simulcast on their website and home video releases on DVD and Blu-ray. In Australia, the series is licensed by Madman Entertainment. Funimation released the first season on August 20, 2013, the second season on November 11, 2014, and the third season on September 6, 2016.

The original score for the series was composed by Ryosuke Nakanishi. For the third season, the opening theme was titled "Bless Your Name" and performed by ChouCho. StylipS performed the ending theme titled "Give Me Secret".


Episode list

Season 3 OVA shorts

References

External links
  
  at FUNimation
 

High School DxD episode lists
2015 Japanese television seasons